América del Pilar Rodrigo was an Argentinian botanist and explorer. Born in the early 20th century, she received a doctorate in botany from the National University of La Plata, and notably worked to classify genera of the family Malvaceae and other spermatophytes.

References 

Botanists active in South America
Possibly living people
Year of birth missing
Place of birth missing
National University of La Plata alumni
Women botanists
20th-century Argentine botanists
Argentine women scientists